Nicolaas ("Nico") Cornelis Maria Verhoeven (born 2 October 1961 in Berkel-Enschot, North Brabant) is a retired road bicycle racer from the Netherlands, who was a professional rider from 1985 to 1995. He represented his native country at the 1984 Summer Olympics in Los Angeles, in the individual road race where he didn't finish the race. Verhoeven won the first stage in the 1987 Tour de France.

Major results

1984
 National Amateur Road Race Championship
1985
Anderlecht
Bodegraven
Nieuw-Amsterdam
Profronde van Pijnacker
Zes van Rijn & Gouwe
1986
Ulvenhout
1987
Tiel
Tour de France:
Winner stage 1
Grote Prijs Stad Zottegem
1988
Tilburg
1989
Made
1990
Houtem
1991
Mijl van Mares
1992
Omloop der Vlaamse Ardennen
Kelmis
1995
Mijl van Mares
Boxmeer

See also
 List of Dutch Olympic cyclists

References

External links 

1961 births
Living people
Dutch male cyclists
Cyclists at the 1984 Summer Olympics
Olympic cyclists of the Netherlands
Sportspeople from Tilburg
Dutch Tour de France stage winners
Cyclists from North Brabant